Jacksonville is a city in Jackson County, Oregon, United States, approximately  west of Medford. It was named for Jackson Creek, which flows through the community and was the site of one of the first placer gold claims in the area. It includes Jacksonville Historic District, which was designated a U.S. National Historic Landmark in 1966. As of the 2010 census, the city population was 2,785, up from 2,235 at the 2000 census.

History 

Jacksonville was founded following discovery of gold deposits in 1851–1852. With the creation of Jackson County, it became the county seat, a role which was transferred to nearby Medford in 1927.

Jacksonville was home to the first Chinatown in Oregon, founded by immigrants from San Francisco. Physical evidence of this chapter of history was uncovered early in March 2004 when road work uncovered artifacts dating to the 1850s and 1860s. Construction was halted while archeologists performed four days of rescue excavations. Their findings included broken Chinese bowls and tea cups, handmade bottles, and fragments of opium paraphernalia and Chinese coins.

As the gold deposits were worked out in the 1860s and the railway bypassed Jacksonville in 1884, the city's economy slowed. This had the unintended benefit of preserving a number of structures, which led to Jacksonville's being designated a National Historic District in 1966, covering over 100 buildings. It was cited as a "mid-19th century inland commercial city significant for its magnificent group of surviving unaltered commercial and residential buildings. The city was the principal financial center of southern Oregon until it was bypassed by the Oregon and California Railroad."

Geography

Demographics

2010 census
As of the census of 2010, there were 2,785 people, 1,377 households, and 808 families residing in the city. The racial makeup of the city was 95.6% White, 0.4% African American, 0.6% Native American, 0.9% Asian, 0.1% Pacific Islander, 0.6% from other races, and 1.9% from two or more races. Hispanic or Latino of any race were 2.9% of the population.

There were 1,377 households, of which 18.3% had children under the age of 18 living with them, 50.5% were married couples living together, 6.1% had a female householder with no husband present, 2.0% had a male householder with no wife present, and 41.3% were non-families. 36.9% of all households were made up of individuals, and 21.1% had someone living alone who was 65 years of age or older. The average household size was 2.02 and the average family size was 2.62.

The median age in the city was 54.9 years. 15.9% of residents were under the age of 18; 4.3% were between the ages of 18 and 24; 14.8% were from 25 to 44; 35.1% were from 45 to 64; and 30% were 65 years of age or older. The gender makeup of the city was 46.2% male and 53.8% female.

2000 census
As of the census of 2000, there were 2,235 people, 1,034 households, and 661 families residing in the city. The population density was 1,230.7 people per square mile (474.1/km). There were 1,102 housing units at an average density of 606.8 per square mile (233.8/km). The racial makeup of the city was 96.11% White, 0.72% Native American, 0.36% Asian, 0.31% African American, 0.40% from other races, and 2.10% from two or more races. Hispanic or Latino of any race were 2.46% of the population.

The largest ancestry groups in Jacksonville, Oregon, include: German (19%), English (18%), Irish (11%), Scottish (4%) and Italian (4%).

There were 1,034 households, out of which 22.2% had children under the age of 18 living with them, 54.4% were married couples living together, 7.6% had a female householder with no husband present, and 36.0% were non-families. 30.5% of all households were made up of individuals, and 18.2% had someone living alone who was 65 years of age or older. The average household size was 2.15 and the average family size was 2.68.

Jacksonville's population is spread out, with 18.9% under the age of 18, 4.3% from 18 to 24, 20.1% from 25 to 44, 32.0% from 45 to 64, and 24.7% who were 65 years of age or older. The median age was 48 years. For every 100 females, there were 84.9 males. For every 100 females age 18 and over, there were 78.7 males.

The median income for a household in the city was $41,250, and the median income for a family was $57,333. Males had a median income of $42,917 versus $28,661 for females. Jacksonville's per capita income is $28,152. About 5.3% of families and 6.6% of the population were below the poverty line, including 5.8% of those under age 18 and 8.6% of those age 65 or over.

Education 
Jacksonville is served by the Medford School District and is home to Jacksonville Elementary School.

Arts and culture 
The Great Northfield Minnesota Raid (1971) was filmed in and around Jacksonville.

Inherit The Wind (1988) a made-for television movie, starring Jason Robards and Kirk Douglas was filmed in Jacksonville. 

The 1946 Technicolor film Canyon Passage takes place in Jacksonville. Though it is fiction, the location itself, a small gold mining town, is extremely important to the theme and plot.

The 2018 AnnaPura film The Sisters Brothers starring Joaquin Phoenix, Jake Gyllenhaal and John C. Reilly. Their characters pass through Jacksonville in pursuit of a bounty.

Annual cultural events
Jacksonville is home to the Britt Festival, a seasonal music festival that takes place at an open-air amphitheater. The site was selected in 1963 because of the acoustic qualities of the surrounding hills. The popular concert series draws national pop, country, alternative and contemporary music acts. It is named after Peter Britt, a pioneer and owner of the land now used for Britt Park.

Museums and other points of interest 

The Southern Oregon Historical Society (SOHS) was formed in 1946 to save the endangered 1880s Jackson County Courthouse. The society opened the Jacksonville Museum in the courthouse building on July 10, 1950, and operated it until it closed in 2006 because of lack of funding; as of 2014 the courthouse, which is now owned by the City of Jacksonville, is not open to the public. The society now operates Hanley Farm in Central Point and a research library in Medford.

Named for Cornelius C. Beekman, the Beekman Native Plant Arboretum is located behind the Beekman House, a house museum owned by the City of Jacksonville and a contributing property of the historic district. Beekman House is managed by Historic Jacksonville, Inc. Other contributing properties in the district formerly owned by the SOHS and now owned by the city include the Beekman Bank, and the Catholic Rectory. The U.S. Hotel was owned by Jackson County and as of 2012 was going to be sold, with proceeds to be split by Jackson County and SOHS.

The 1859 B. F. Dowell House, a private residence and contributing property, is the oldest Italianate brick residence in Oregon.

The William Bybee House, near Jacksonville, now known as Bybee's Historic Inn, is individually listed on the National Register of Historic Places.

Media
Jacksonville is served by the Mail Tribune newspaper, published in Medford.

Notable people 

 Kirstie Alley, actress
 Cornelius C. Beekman, early resident and banker
 Peter Britt, early resident and pioneer photographer
 Bruce Campbell, actor, producer, writer, comedian, and director
 Helen Cha-Pyo, orchestra conductor and organist
 Gary Dahl, creator of the Pet Rock
 Pinto Colvig, the original Bozo the Clown and voice of Goofy and Pluto
 Adrienne King, actress
 Beth Marion, actress
 Millie Perkins, film and television actress
 Steve Reeves, bodybuilder, actor
 John E. Ross, colonel in the Modoc War, Josephine County representative to the Oregon Territorial Legislature
 Dave Schwep, director and photographer
 John Trudeau, musician and orchestra conductor
 Kitty Wilkins, horse breeder

Sister cities
Jacksonville has one sister city, as designated by Sister Cities International:

  Lawrence, New Zealand

Footnotes

External links
 City of Jacksonville official website
 Entry for Jacksonville in the Oregon Blue Book
 Jacksonville Chamber of Commerce
 Historic photos of Jacksonville from Salem Public Library

 
Cities in Oregon
Cities in Jackson County, Oregon
1860 establishments in Oregon
Populated places established in 1860
Former county seats in Oregon